The Werfen Formation is a geologic formation in the Southern Limestone Alps and Dinaric Alps of Austria, Bosnia and Herzegovina and Italy. It preserves fossils dating back to the Triassic period.

Fossil content 
The formation has provided numerous fossils typical of a shallow lagoon environment, including
 Eotiaris teseroensis

See also 
 List of fossiliferous stratigraphic units in Austria
 List of fossiliferous stratigraphic units in Bosnia and Herzegovina
 List of fossiliferous stratigraphic units in Italy

References

Bibliography

Further reading 
 E. Farabegoli, M. C. Perri, and R. Posenato. 2007. Environmental and biotic changes across the Permian-Triassic boundary in western Tethys: The Bulla parastratotype, Italy. Global and Planetary Change 55:109-135
 E. Kustatscher, M. Wachtler, and J.H.A. Konijnenburg-van Cittert. 2004. A number of additional and revised taxa from the Ladinian flora of the Dolomites, Northern Italy. Geo.Alp 1:57-69
 R. Posenato. 2009. Survival patterns of macrobenthic marine assemblages during the end-Permian mass extinction in the western Tethys (Dolomites, Italy). Palaeogeography, Palaeoclimatology, Palaeoecology 280:150-167
 A. Bittner. 1890. Brachiopoden der alpinen Trias. Abhandlungen der Kaiserlich-Königlichen Geologischen Reichsanstalt 14:1-325

Geologic formations of Austria
Geology of Bosnia and Herzegovina
Geologic formations of Italy
Permian System of Europe
Permian Austria
Permian Italy
Triassic System of Europe
Triassic Austria
Triassic Italy
Changhsingian
Induan
Olenekian
Ladinian
Anisian
Limestone formations
Marl formations
Mudstone formations
Siltstone formations
Sandstone formations
Lagoonal deposits
Shallow marine deposits
Permian northern paleotropical deposits
Paleontology in Austria
Paleontology in Italy
Formations
Geology of the Alps